The Ukrainian Embassy in Bratislava is the diplomatic mission of Ukraine in Slovakia . The embassy building is located at Radvanská 35 in Bratislava . The Ukrainian ambassador to Slovakia has been Yuri Mushka since January 2017.

History 
During the Interwar era the Ukrainian Oblast Zakarpattia was part of Czechoslovakia, before being ceded to Hungary.

After the collapse of the Soviet Union , Ukraine declared itself independent in August 1991. On January 1, 1993, Ukraine became one of the first countries in the world to recognize the state independence of the Slovak Republic. The continuation of diplomatic relations with Slovakia was agreed as the official date for the establishment of diplomatic relations June 9 applies, 1934. Diplomatic representative was before 1993 the ambassador in Prague . Roman Lubkivskyi was accredited as the first ambassador . Inna Ohniwez was the first ambassador in 2005.

Both countries established diplomatic relations on January 1, 1993. Slovakia has an embassy in Kyiv, a general consulate in Uzhhorod, a and 2 honorary consulates (in Donetsk and Uzhhorod). Ukraine has an embassy in Bratislava and a general consulate in Prešov.

In 2000, Slovakia set up a consulate general in Uzhhorod.

The countries share 97 km of common border. There are between 40,000 and 100,000 people of Ukrainian descent living in Slovakia.

Consular offices of Ukraine in Slovakia 
Consular section of the Embassy of Ukraine in Bratislava

Embassy in Slovakia 

The embassy is located at Radvanská 35 in the west of the Slovak capital.

Ambassador and envoy of Ukraine in Slovakia  

Roman Lubkivskyi (1992-1993)

Petro Sardachuk (1993–1995)

Dmytro Pavlychko (1995–1998)

Yuriy Rylatsch (1998-2004)

Serhiy Ustytsch (2004-2005)

Inna Ohnivez (2005-2010)

Ivan Kholostenko (2010)

Oleh Havaschi (2010-2016)

Yuri Mushka (2017–)

See also
 Slovakia-Ukraine relations
 List of diplomatic missions in Slovakia
 Foreign relations of Slovakia
 Foreign relations of Ukraine

References

Slovakia–Ukraine relations
Bratislava
Ukraine